Amyema is a genus of semi-parasitic shrubs (mistletoes) which occur in Malesia and Australia.

Etymology
Amyema derives from the Greek: a (negative), and myeo (I initiate), referring to the genus being previously unrecognised.

Description
Hamilton & Barlow describe the haustorial structures of most Australian Amyemas as being ball-like, with some exceptions.

Species
There are approximately 90 species including the following:
 Amyema arthrocaulis Barlow
 Amyema artensis (Mont.) Dan.  (indigenous to Upolu and Savai'i, known as tapuna.)
 Amyema benthamii (Blakely) Danser
 Amyema betchei (Blakely) Danser
 Amyema bifurcata (Benth.) Tiegh.
 Amyema biniflora Barlow
 Amyema brassii Barlow  
 Amyema brevipes (Tiegh.) Danser       
 Amyema cambagei (Blakely) Danser
 Amyema congener (Sieber ex Schult. & Schult.f.) Tiegh.
 Amyema conspicua (F.M.Bailey) Danser
 Amyema dolichopoda Barlow
 Amyema duurenii Barlow
 Amyema eburna (Barlow) Barlow
 Amyema fitzgeraldii (Blakely) Danser - pincushion mistletoe 
 Amyema gaudichaudii (DC.) Tiegh.
 Amyema gibberula (Tate) Danser
 Amyema glabra (Domin) Danser
 Amyema haematodes (O.Schwarz) Danser
 Amyema herbertiana Barlow
 Amyema hilliana (Blakely) Danser
 Amyema linophylla (Fenzl) Tiegh.
 Amyema lisae Pelser & Barcelona
 Amyema lucasii (Blakely) Danser         	 
 Amyema mackayensis (Blakely) Danser
 Amyema maidenii (Blakely) Barlow   
 Amyema melaleucae (Lehm. ex Miq.) Tiegh.        	
 Amyema microphylla Barlow       	
 Amyema miquelii (Lehm. ex Miq.) Tiegh. - stalked mistletoe      	 
 Amyema miraculosa (Miq.) Tiegh.        	 
 Amyema nestor (S.Moore) Danser
Amyema nickrentii Barcelona & Pelser
 Amyema pendula (Sieber ex Spreng.) Tiegh. - drooping mistletoe
 Amyema preissii (Miq.) Tiegh. - wireleaf mistletoe     	
 Amyema quandang (Lindl.) Tiegh.       	 
 Amyema quaternifolia Barlow        	
 Amyema queenslandica (Blakely) Danser         	
 Amyema sanguinea (F.Muell.) Danser
 Amyema seemeniana (K.Schum.) Danser         	     
 Amyema subcapitata Barlow  
 Amyema tetraflora (Barlow) Barlow    
 Amyema tetrapetala (Danser) Barlow
 Amyema thalassia Barlow        	 
 Amyema tridactyla Barlow        	
 Amyema tristis (Zoll.) Tiegh.        	
 Amyema verticillata (Merr.) Danser       	
 Amyema villiflora (Domin) Barlow         	
 Amyema whitei (Blakely) Danser

Faunal associations
The mistletoebird is known to consume the fruit of Amyema quandang as well as other mistletoe species from which its name is derived.

Larvae of the butterfly genus Delias often use various Amyema species as larval food plants. In doing so, the adults acquire a taste that is unpalatable to predators.

Uses
The fruit of Amyema species is high in protein, lipids, and carbohydrates, and was eaten by the Ngunnawal people.

References

External links
 
 

 
Parasitic plants
Loranthaceae genera
Taxa named by Philippe Édouard Léon Van Tieghem
Plants described in 1895